Sybil Danning (born Sybille Johanna Danninger) is an Austrian–American actress, model, and film producer. She is best known for her frequent appearances in B movies during the 1970s and 1980s.

Biography

Early years and first films
Born in Austria, Danning spent most of her childhood on military bases and traveling with her family around the world. After their return to Austria, she landed a job as a dental hygienist to support her family following her parents' divorce. At the age of sixteen, Danning left her home and relocated to Salzburg, where she enrolled at a school of cosmetology.

Working as a cosmetician, Danning was soon offered fashion shows and photo layouts. She made her onscreen debut in the German comedy, Komm nur, mein liebstes Vögelein (1968), followed by the role of Kriemhild in the erotic action film, The Long Swift Sword of Siegfried (1971). She continued receiving small parts in films mostly based on her sex symbol image.

Rise to fame (1980–1990)
In 1978, Danning moved to Hollywood to further her career. Roger Corman's space opera cult classic, Battle Beyond the Stars (1980) helped to established her as a B movie actress. She appeared in a number of films during the 1980s: Chained Heat (1983), Hercules (1983), Malibu Express (1985), Howling II: Your Sister Is a Werewolf (1985), and Reform School Girls (1986).

In 1990, her acting career was disrupted when she suffered a spinal disc herniation while rehearsing a film stunt.

Return (2003–present)
In 2003, Danning was invited by Kevin Clement of the Chiller Theatre, New Jersey, to meet her long-time fans. She went and was overwhelmed by fans who told her they wanted to see her on the big screen again. Chiller Theater prominently featured Danning in her first appearance after her hiatus in its 2004 documentary, UnConventional. The year 2007 marked Danning's return to the big screen in a faux trailer directed by Rob Zombie titled Werewolf Women of the SS for Quentin Tarantino's Grindhouse, and again for Rob Zombie's 2007 remake of John Carpenter's original 1978 film, Halloween.

Danning returned to Austria in 2008 to play Patrick Swayze's witness Anna Gruber in the drama film Jump!, loosely based on the real-life Halsman murder case. She also appeared in five episodes of the gay-themed vampire television series The Lair as a sinister vampire out for revenge. In 2010, Danning appeared in the horror film, Virus X. In 2011, she starred in and produced a horror/music video for American hard rock band, the Last Vegas.

Other ventures

Sports
From 2002 to 2003, Danning was a shareholder of the German ice hockey team, SC Riessersee. As the first ever female co-owner of a German hockey team, Danning brought in three American players to the team, and saw the team return to the Vice Championship.

Selected filmography

Awards and nominations

References

External links

 
 
 
 
 Sybil Danning TV Guide

Austrian expatriates in the United States
Austrian film actresses
Austrian television actresses
Austrian voice actresses
American film actresses
American television actresses
American voice actresses
British film actresses
British television actresses
British voice actresses
20th-century Austrian actresses
21st-century Austrian actresses
Living people
Year of birth missing (living people)